Abortion in Bahrain is legal upon request, upon authorization by a panel of physicians. By the Penal Code of 1976, abortion is only illegal in Bahrain when it is self-induced which subjects the pregnant woman to up to six months in prison, or when it is performed without the woman's consent, which merits up to ten years' imprisonment.

The United Nations reported an abortion rate of 11.1 abortions per 1000 women aged 15–44 .

References 

Health in Bahrain
Bahrain
Bahrain